Kurukkan Rajavayi is a 1987 Indian Malayalam-language throughout comedy film directed by P. Chandrakumar. The film stars Mukesh, Maniyanpilla Raju, Saleema and Jagathy Sreekumar in the lead roles. The film has musical score by A. T. Ummer.

Plot

Prathapan Nair (Mukesh) and Rajendran Nair (Maniyanpilla Raju) are cousins and roommates. While they were bathing in a stream they accidentally find a dead body(Oduvil Unnikrishnan). A series of comic events forms the rest of the movie.

Cast
Mukesh... Prathapan Nair
Maniyanpilla Raju... Rajendran Nair
Saleema
Jagathy Sreekumar
Kuthiravattam Pappu as Tea Shop owner
Oduvil Unnikrishnan
 Sathaar
 T.G Ravi
 Soorya
 Bahadoor as Rajendran's father

Soundtrack
The music was composed by A. T. Ummer and the lyrics were written by Poovachal Khader.

References

External links
 

1987 films
1980s Malayalam-language films
Films directed by P. Chandrakumar